Counties, formally county-level divisions, are found in the third level of the administrative hierarchy in Provinces and Autonomous regions and the second level in municipalities and Hainan, a level that is known as "county level" and also contains autonomous counties, county-level cities, banners, autonomous banners and City districts. There are 1,355 counties in Mainland China out of a total of 2,851 county-level divisions.

The term xian is sometimes translated as "district" or "prefecture" when put in the context of Chinese history.

History 

Xian have existed since the Warring States period and were set up nationwide by the Qin Dynasty. The number of counties in China proper gradually increased from dynasty to dynasty. As Qin Shi Huang reorganized the counties after his unification, there were about 1,000. Under the Eastern Han Dynasty, the number of counties increased to above 1,000. About 1400 existed when the Sui dynasty abolished the commandery level (郡 jùn), which was the level just above counties, and demoted some commanderies to counties. The current number of counties mostly resembled that of the later years of Qing Dynasty. Changes of location and names of counties in Chinese history have been a major field of research in Chinese historical geography, especially from the 1960s to the 1980s.

In Imperial China, the county was a significant administrative unit because it marked the lowest level of the imperial bureaucratic structure; in other words, it was the lowest level that the government reached. Government below the county level was often undertaken through informal non-bureaucratic means, varying between dynasties. The head of a county was the magistrate, who oversaw both the day-to-day operations of the county as well as civil and criminal cases.

During the Republican period, counties were the second level administrative divisions of its provinces. After the Chinese Civil War, counties became subordinate to prefectural level cities while the previous structure is retained. The counties became directly governed by the Executive Yuan after the provinces became streamlined in 1998, but they were fully abolished in 2018.

Autonomous counties 

Autonomous counties are a special class of counties in Mainland China reserved for non-Han Chinese ethnic minorities. Autonomous counties are found all over China, and are given, by law, more legislative power than regular counties.

There are 117 autonomous counties in Mainland China.

Government 
As the Chinese Communist Party (CCP) is central to directing government policy in Mainland China, every level of administrative division has a local CCP Committee. A county's is called the Secretary, the de facto highest office of the county. Policies are carried out via the People's government of the county, and its head is called the County Governor. The governor is often also one of the deputy secretaries in the CCP Committee.

See also 
  — historical
 List of counties in the People's Republic of China
 List of county-level divisions of China
 History of the administrative divisions of China
 Attached county, a former sort of xian in late Imperial China
 County (Taiwan)

References

Citations

Sources 

 

 
 01
Administrative divisions of China
China 3
Counties, China